Walter Edward Armour (28 April 1921 – 10 May 1995) was an  Australian rules footballer who played with St Kilda in the Victorian Football League (VFL).

Personal life
Anderson served as a private in the Australian Army during the Second World War.

Notes

External links 

1921 births
1995 deaths
Australian rules footballers from Victoria (Australia)
St Kilda Football Club players
Australian Army personnel of World War II
Australian Army soldiers